Two Sea Shepherd vessels have been named Farley Mowat, after the Canadian writer and environmentalist:

 , a former fisheries research vessel, operated 1996–2008
 , a former US Coast Guard patrol boat, acquired in 2016

Ship names